HMS Australia was one of seven  armoured cruisers built for the Royal Navy in the mid-1880s. She was assigned to the Mediterranean Fleet in 1889 and remained there until 1893 when she returned home. The ship was assigned to the Coast Guard Squadron for the next decade before she was placed in reserve in 1903. Australia was sold for scrap in 1905.

Design and description

During her sea trials, Australia reached . The ship's complement was 484 officers and ratings.

Australias main armament consisted of two breech-loading (BL)  Mk V guns, one gun fore and aft of the superstructure on pivot mounts. Her secondary armament was ten BL  guns, five on each broadside. Protection against torpedo boats was provided by six quick-firing (QF) 6-pounder Hotchkiss guns and ten QF 3-pounder Hotchkiss guns, most of which were mounted on the main deck in broadside positions. The ship was also armed with six 18-inch (457 mm) torpedo tubes: four on the broadside above water and one each in the bow and stern below water.

The ends of the armour belt were closed off by transverse bulkheads .

Construction and service
Australia, named for the Australian continent, was laid down on 21 April 1885 by Robert Napier and Sons at their shipyard in Govan, Glasgow.

The ship was launched on 25 November 1886, and completed on 11 December 1888. Shortly after commissioning, she was assigned to the Mediterranean Fleet and remained there until 1893 when she participated in the Columbian Review held in New York City that year to commemorate the 400th anniversary of Columbus' discovery of the New World.

Upon her return home, Australia became the coast guard ship for Southampton Water for the next decade. Captain Charles Henry Adair was briefly in command from November 1899 to January 1900, when Captain George Neville was appointed in command on 20 January 1900. She escorted the royal yacht  when Queen Victoria visited Ireland in April 1900, and in September the following year she visited Germany and Denmark when she escorted the royal yacht carrying King Edward VII from Hamburg to Elsinore.

She took part in the fleet review held at Spithead on 16 August 1902 for the coronation of King Edward VII. Captain Charles Home Cochran was appointed in command on 24 November 1902, but the ship was placed in reserve at Chatham Dockyard in early 1903, before being sold for scrap on 4 April 1905.

Notes

References

External links

 

Orlando-class cruisers
1886 ships